Kairi may originally refer to: Sea

Places 
Trinidad was formerly known as Kairi; see Trinidad and Tobago
Kairi, Queensland, a small town in Far North Queensland, Australia
Kairi Ka Igamba, Kenya

People 
Kairi (name)

Fictional characters 
 Kairi (Kingdom Hearts), a character from the Kingdom Hearts series of video games
 Kairi Sanjo, a character from the manga series Shugo Chara! by Peach-Pit
 Kairi (Street Fighter), a character from the Street Fighter series of video games
 Kairi Tanaga, a minor character who appeared in Batman: The Animated Series and Batman Beyond
 Kairi, a character from the manga series Yumekui Kenbun: Nightmare Inspector by Shin Mashiba
 Kairi Yano, a character from tokusatsu series Kaitou Sentai Lupinranger VS Keisatsu Sentai Patranger
 Kairi Imahara, called Valkyrie, a character from the video game Apex Legends

Other uses
 Kairi language, another name for the Rumu language and Japanese language as used in Papua New Guinea
 Kairi, another word for unripe green mangoes in India, used in dishes like Kairi ka Do Pyaza
Kairi — Rishta Khatta Meetha, an Indian TV series

See also

Karri (disambiguation)
 Kyrie (disambiguation)

Japanese unisex given names